Catholic Family News (CFN) is a Traditionalist Catholic monthly publication of Catholic Family Ministries.

History
Founded in 1994, CFN was run for many years by John Vennari (1958-2017). Vennari served as both editor and publisher of CFN. He was succeeded as managing editor by Matt Gaspers. Brian McCall became editor-in-chief in 2018. McCall is quoted as saying, "The newspaper will follow the direction (Vennari) set for decades and that direction does not and will not involve bigotry or injustice against any people on the grounds of race or ethnicity."

Editorial views
An associate and collaborator of Nicholas Gruner, Vennari was a frequent contributor to Gruner's Fatima Crusader. Catholic Family News has a close relationship with Marcel Lefebvre's Society of Saint Pius X (SSPX). Vennari's funeral service, at his request, was conducted by members of SSPX. The SSPX publishing house, Angelus Press, is a CFN advertiser and CFN editor Brian McCall has appeared at conferences sponsored by Angelus Press. In June 2018, shortly after becoming editor-in-chief, McCall interviewed Niklaus Pfluger, First General Assistant of SSPX. 

In 2014, McCall's book To Build the City of God: Living as Catholics in a Secular Age was published. In a chapter discussing "Modest Contact With the World: Women In Pants and Similar Frauds", McCall wrote, "Women must veil their form to obscure its contours out of charity towards men. To know that women in pants have this effect on men and to wear them is thus a sin against charity as well as modesty."   

In April 2019, McCall was one of nineteen original signatories to an "open letter" accusing Pope Francis of heresy.

The paper also includes devotional materials, and articles on historic Roman Catholic teachings and persons. Articles have appeared on Sister Annella Zervas, O.S.B., Blessed Theodore Romzha, Mother Agnes Hart, and Father Leo Heinrichs, O.F.M.

According to the Southern Poverty Law Center, Catholic Family News classifies as a hate group for their adherence to integrism and the group's antisemitic claims.

References

External links
 Bryan McCall's campus page

Traditionalist Catholic newspapers
Monthly newspapers
Publications established in 1994